Henry Gustave Hiller (1865–1946) was an artist based in Liverpool, England.  He studied at the Manchester School of Art and is mainly known as a designer of painted gesso reliefs and stained glass.

Works

Stained glass

 
Accrington Library, Accrington, Lancashire. 1908. Very large window in staircase depicting Knowledge holding a lamp etc. 
Leigh Town Hall, Leigh, Greater Manchester; Council Chamber. 1908. Personifications.
St Sannan's Church, Llansannan, North Wales. 1910. Window on the south wall of the nave.
St Thomas' Church, Werneth, Oldham. 1911.  Baptistery; depicting cardinal virtues.
All Saints Church, Thornton Hough, Wirral.  1912. Window in the north transept as a memorial to James Darcy Lever, brother of William Lever.
St Michael's Church, Aigburth, Liverpool. First World War memorial in the porch.
St Barnabas' Church, Allerton Road, Mossley Hill, Liverpool.  East window - a First World War memorial.
St Bridget's Church, Bagot Street, Wavertree, Liverpool.  Baptistery - another First World War memorial.
St Helen's Church, Sefton. 1936. A series of windows in the south chapel.
Christ Church, Linnet Lane, Liverpool. Two windows in the south aisle, one depicting the east end of Liverpool Cathedral.
St Oswald's Church, Bidston, Birkenhead. South aisle.
St John the Baptist's Church, Meols.  Windows in the baptistery and north aisle.
St John's Church, Tottington, Greater Manchester. Windows in the chancel depicting cardinal virtues.
Ceiriog Memorial Institute, Glyn Ceiriog, North Wales.  Window in the gable end commemorating John Ceiriog Hughes.
St Stephen's Church, Hutton, Cumbria.  Window depicting Christ the Good Shepherd in memory of Queen Victoria.
St. Mary's Church, West Bank, Widnes; Lady Chapel. Undated. Stained glass memorial window depicting Jesus, The Good Shepherd.

Other works

The Vines public house, Lime Street, Liverpool. 1907. Plaster reliefs.
Liverpool Museum. Illustrations of Anglesey seaweeds.

References
Citations

Sources

See also
Photograph of Hiller's window in All Saints Church, Thornton Hough

1865 births
1946 deaths
British male painters
British stained glass artists and manufacturers
Artists from Liverpool
19th-century British painters
20th-century British painters
19th-century British male artists
20th-century British male artists